
Lago di Morghirolo is a lake in Ticino, Switzerland.

The lake can be reached by foot from Dalpe or Polpiano.

See also
List of mountain lakes of Switzerland

References

External links
Laghetto di Morghirolo  

Morghirolo